Google Surveys (formerly Google Consumer Surveys) was a business product by Google aimed at facilitating customized market research. Released in 2012, Google announced in September 2022 that it would close on November 1, 2022. This product was designed by Google as an alternative to internet pay walls for websites that publish content. The program was launched by several online publishers such as Pandora, AdWeek, and the New York Daily News. Google Surveys was part of the Google Marketing Platform.

Model

Google Surveys provided both a web interface with which to design the survey as well as the audience that would take the survey. The survey questions were subject to some requirements in length and content.

Google received money from business customers such as market research firms and small businesses who create the surveys. In addition to the paid services, Google also offered a free survey for websites with predefined questions targeted at people visiting the website. Every time a user responded to a survey, the publishers would earn .

From the consumer side, the surveys worked as a paywall (also called a "survey-wall") for websites offering premium content. Users visiting these websites had the option of responding to a survey to access content for free.

History

The product was launched on March 29, 2012.

On February 19, 2015, Google announced Consumer Surveys as a platform for publishers to monetize their online content. Initially, this platform was available only for publishers from the USA, UK and Canada. Publishers' payments were made through the AdSense payment system, but the platform had its own management and reporting console.

On October 19, 2016, Google announced that it had renamed the product from Google Consumer Surveys to Google Surveys and was moving it to part of the Google Analytics product suite.

In September 2022, Google announced that Google Surveys would close on November 1, 2022.

Reception

Notable uses of Google Surveys included voter information tools and behavior surveys of holiday travelers. Google Surveys published voter opinion polls leading up to the 2012 US presidential elections. According to New York Times' blogger and statistician Nate Silver, the Google Surveys' election polls were ranked second in terms of reliability and lack of bias in predicting election results.

Pew Research Center conducted a series of tests to evaluate Google Surveys in consultation with Google. In November 2012, Pew independently published an analysis of the results up to that point which stated in part that a "comparison of several demographic questions asked by Pew Research indicates that the Google Consumer Surveys sample appears to conform closely to the demographic composition of the overall internet population".

Google Surveys has been compared to SurveyMonkey (which also offers both a survey creation interface as well as a way to purchase an audience), where it was praised for its low cost per response but was found to have less flexibility in designing the survey.

Google also reviewed Google Surveys in a white paper, concluding that "Google Consumer Surveys can be used in place of more traditional Internet-based panels without sacrificing accuracy" while also stating that "[s]ince Google Consumer Surveys only allows one-question or screening two-question surveys, analysis of the relationships between survey questions are difficult or sometimes not even possible".

See also
 Comparison of survey software
 Survata
 Jotform

References

Surveys
Polling companies